The 1905 Kentucky State College Blue and White football team represented Kentucky State College—now known as the University of Kentucky—as an independent during the 1905 college football season. Led by Fred Schacht in his second and final year as head coach, Kentucky State College compiled a record of 6–3–1.

Schedule

References

Kentucky State College
Kentucky Wildcats football seasons
Kentucky State College Blue and White football